Red Island is a circular, flat-topped island,  in diameter and  high, with reddish cliffs of volcanic rock, lying  northwest of Cape Lachman, James Ross Island, in Prince Gustav Channel. It is part of the James Ross Island Volcanic Group and was discovered and named by the Swedish Antarctic Expedition under Otto Nordenskjöld, 1901-04. The island has a K–Ar date of 1.6 ± 0.2 million years.

See also 
 List of Antarctic and subantarctic islands

References

Islands of Trinity Peninsula
Volcanic islands
Volcanoes of Graham Land
Pleistocene volcanoes